Pingle is a town in Qionglai City, Sichuan Province, China.

See also 
 List of township-level divisions of Sichuan

References

External links
Pingle famous Bridge
Pingle Ancient Town in Flickr
Pingle Town in Travel Guide
Pingle(aka) Pinglezhen in Google map

Qionglai City
Towns in Sichuan